The 2018 Los Cabos Open (also known as the Abierto Mexicano de Tenis Mifel presentado por Cinemex for sponsorship reasons) was an ATP tennis tournament played on outdoor hard courts. It was the 3rd edition of the Los Cabos Open, and part of the ATP World Tour 250 series of the 2018 ATP World Tour. It took place in Los Cabos, Mexico from July 30 through August 5, 2018.

Singles main-draw entrants

Seeds 

 Rankings are as of July 23, 2018.

Other entrants 
The following players received wildcards into the singles main draw:
  Ernesto Escobedo
  Lucas Gómez
  Thanasi Kokkinakis

The following players received entry using a protected ranking into the singles main draw:
  Egor Gerasimov
  Yoshihito Nishioka

The following players received entry from the qualifying draw:
  Marcos Giron
  Prajnesh Gunneswaran
  Takanyi Garanganga
  Mohamed Safwat

The following player received entry as a lucky loser:
  Daniel Elahi Galán

Withdrawals 
Before the tournament
  Matthew Ebden → replaced by  Marcelo Arévalo
  Ryan Harrison → replaced by  Daniel Elahi Galán
  Filip Krajinović → replaced by  Egor Gerasimov
  John Millman → replaced by  Bernard Tomic
  Jack Sock → replaced by  Quentin Halys

Doubles main-draw entrants

Seeds 

 Rankings are as of July 23, 2018.

Other entrants 
The following pairs received wildcards into the doubles main draw:
  Lucas Gómez /  Luis Patiño 
  Manuel Sánchez /  Bernard Tomic

Champions

Singles 

  Fabio Fognini def.  Juan Martín del Potro, 6–4, 6–2

Doubles 

   Marcelo Arévalo /  Miguel Ángel Reyes-Varela def.  Taylor Fritz /  Thanasi Kokkinakis, 6–4, 6–4

References

External links 
 

Los Cabos Open
2018 in Mexican tennis
2018
Los Cabos Open
Los Cabos Open